Nicola Jane Carey (born 10 September 1993) is an Australian cricketer who plays for the national cricket team as an all-rounder, batting left-handed and bowling right-arm medium pace. At the domestic level, she plays in the Women's National Cricket League for Tasmania and in the Women's Big Bash League for the Hobart Hurricanes. Until 2019, she played in those two competitions for the New South Wales Breakers and the Sydney Thunder, respectively.

Career
Carey was a member of the victorious Southern Stars squad that won the 2012 ICC World Twenty20 title in Sri Lanka. Carey was part of two ICC World Twenty20 in 2012 and in 2016.

She made her Women's One Day International cricket (WODI) debut for Australia Women against India Women on 12 March 2018.  Although she bowled well, and was praised by the team's coach, Matthew Mott, as having had "a fabulous debut", she did not take any wickets in her 10 overs, and was not required to bat.  Her teammate Alyssa Healy commented that "...  it was probably one of the most unlucky debuts I’ve ever seen.”

She made her Women's Twenty20 International cricket (WT20I) debut for Australia Women against England Women on 23 March 2018 in the 2017–18 India women's Tri-Nation Series.

In April 2018, she was one of the fourteen players to be awarded a national contract for the 2018–19 season by Cricket Australia. In October 2018, she was named in Australia's squad for the 2018 ICC Women's World Twenty20 tournament in the West Indies.

In November 2018, she was named in Sydney Thunder's squad for the 2018–19 Women's Big Bash League season. In April 2019, Cricket Australia awarded her with a contract ahead of the 2019–20 season. In June 2019, Cricket Australia named her in Australia's team for their tour to England to contest the Women's Ashes. In January 2020, she was named in Australia's squad for the 2020 ICC Women's T20 World Cup in Australia.

In August 2021, Carey was named in Australia's squad for their series against India, which included a one-off day/night Test match as part of the tour. In January 2022, Carey was named in Australia's squad for their series against England to contest the Women's Ashes. Later the same month, she was named in Australia's team for the 2022 Women's Cricket World Cup in New Zealand. In May 2022, Carey was named in Australia's team for the cricket tournament at the 2022 Commonwealth Games in Birmingham, England.

References

External links 

 
 
 Nicola Carey at Cricket Australia
 

1993 births
Australia women One Day International cricketers
Australia women Twenty20 International cricketers
Cricketers from Sydney
Hobart Hurricanes (WBBL) cricketers
Living people
New South Wales Breakers cricketers
Sydney Thunder (WBBL) cricketers
Tasmanian Tigers (women's cricket) cricketers
Cricketers at the 2022 Commonwealth Games
Commonwealth Games gold medallists for Australia
Commonwealth Games medallists in cricket
20th-century Australian women
21st-century Australian women
Welsh Fire cricketers
Medallists at the 2022 Commonwealth Games